Robers v. United States, 572 U.S. 639 (2014), is a US criminal law case. The United States Supreme Court held in a unanimous decision that restitution in cases involving mortgage fraud is determined by the actual money lent not the value of the property. Benjamin Robers had been convicted of mortgage fraud. The District Court had ordered Robers to pay the difference between the amount lent to him and the amount the banks received in selling the houses that had served as collateral for the loans. Robers claimed that the District Court should have instead reduced the restitution amount by the value of the houses on the date the banks took title to them since that was when "part of the property" was "returned."  The Supreme Court affirmed the Appellate and District courts.

References

External links
 

2014 in United States case law
United States criminal case law
United States Supreme Court cases of the Roberts Court
United States Supreme Court cases